Florence station is an at-grade light rail station on the A Line of the Los Angeles Metro Rail system. The station is located alongside the Union Pacific freight railroad's Wilmington Subdivision (the historic route of the Pacific Electric Railway), at its intersection with Florence Avenue, after which the station is named, in the unincorporated Los Angeles County neighborhood of Florence.

Service

Station layout

Hours and frequency

Connections 
, the following connections are available:
LADOT DASH: Chesterfield Square

References

A Line (Los Angeles Metro) stations
Railway stations in the United States opened in 1990
1990 establishments in California
Pacific Electric stations